Ronald Blair (born January 21, 1993) is an American football defensive end who is a free agent. He played college football at Appalachian State. He was drafted by the San Francisco 49ers in the fifth round of the 2016 NFL Draft, and played for the team until 2020.

Early life
Blair was born in Greensboro, Georgia and attended Greene County High School, where he played football. In 2010, he was named the Georgia Region 4-AA Defensive Player of the Year.

College career
Blair played college football at Appalachian State University from 2011-2015. In 2015, Blair was named Sun Belt Conference Defensive Student-Athlete of the Year, first-team all-conference honoree. In the Raycom Media Camellia Bowl, he forced a fumble and returned it 20 yards in the Mountaineers 31–29 victory over the Ohio Bobcats.

Professional career

Coming out of Appalachian State, analysts had Blair projected to be drafted anywhere from the third to sixth round. He was ranked the thirteenth best defensive end out of the 171 available by NFLDraftScout.com. Blair was invited to the NFL Combine and performed all the drills. He injured his quad on his first 40-yard dash attempt. At Appalachian State's Pro Day, he was able to successfully improve on all his numbers, except the shuttle, but chose not to redo his bench press or 3-cone drill. He improved his 40-yard dash from 5.18 to 4.85, his 20-yard from 2.96 to 2.81, his 10-yard from 1.74 to 1.63, his vertical from 30 inches to 33.5 inches, and broad jump from 9'5" to 9'11".

San Francisco 49ers
Blair was drafted by the San Francisco 49ers in the fifth round, 142nd overall, in the 2016 NFL Draft. On November 27, 2016, Blair got his first NFL sack on Ryan Tannehill of the Miami Dolphins. He ended his rookie season playing in all 16 games, recording 16 tackles and three sacks.

On September 3, 2017, Blair was placed on injured reserve. He was activated off injured reserve to the active roster on November 4, 2017.

On November 13, 2019, Blair was placed on injured reserve after he tore his ACL in a Week 10 27-24 overtime loss to the Seattle Seahawks. Without Blair, the 49ers reached Super Bowl LIV, but lost 31-20 to the Kansas City Chiefs.

On March 23, 2020, Blair re-signed with the 49ers. He was placed on the active/physically unable to perform list (PUP) at the start of training camp on July 28, 2020, and was placed on the reserve/PUP list at the start of the regular season on September 5, 2020. He was released after the season on March 12, 2021.

New York Jets
On June 1, 2021, Blair signed with the New York Jets, reuniting him with his former defensive coordinator Robert Saleh. He was released on August 31, 2021 and re-signed to the practice squad the next day.

References

External links
 Appalachian State Mountaineers bio

1993 births
Living people
People from Greensboro, Georgia
Players of American football from Georgia (U.S. state)
American football defensive ends
American football linebackers
Appalachian State Mountaineers football players
San Francisco 49ers players
New York Jets players